Cisco Way is a light rail station operated by Santa Clara Valley Transportation Authority (VTA). This station is served by the Orange Line of the VTA Light Rail system.

The station was opened on May 17, 2001, as part of the first phase of VTA's Tasman East light rail extension.

Service

Station layout

Location 
Cisco Way station is located in the median of Tasman Drive just west of Cisco Way in northern San Jose, California.  It is located near the headquarters of Cisco Systems, which Cisco Way was named after.

References

External links 

Santa Clara Valley Transportation Authority light rail stations
Santa Clara Valley Transportation Authority bus stations
Railway stations in San Jose, California
Railway stations in the United States opened in 2001
2001 establishments in California